{{DISPLAYTITLE:C7H14N2}}
The molecular formula C7H14N2 (molar mass: 126.20 g/mol) may refer to:

 Bispidine (3,7-diazabicyclo[3.3.1]nonane)
 N,N'-Diisopropylcarbodiimide

Molecular formulas